Francisco Mora Ciprés (born 16 July 1961) is a Mexican politician affiliated with the Party of the Democratic Revolution. He served as Deputy of the LIX Legislature of the Mexican Congress as a plurinominal representative, and previously served as municipal president of Jiquilpan from 1996 to 1998.

References

Francisco Mora Cipres

1961 births
Living people
Politicians from Michoacán
Members of the Chamber of Deputies (Mexico)
Party of the Democratic Revolution politicians
20th-century Mexican politicians
21st-century Mexican politicians
Municipal presidents in Michoacán
Deputies of the LIX Legislature of Mexico